Anopterus is a genus of two species of shrubs or small trees.

Species
 Anopterus glandulosus (Tasmanian laurel) - western Tasmania
 Anopterus macleayanus (Mountain laurel) - eastern Australia

References 

Escalloniaceae
Asterid genera
Asterids of Australia